Sebastian Milewski (born 30 April 1998) is a Polish professional footballer who plays as a midfielder for Arka Gdynia.

Career

Piast Gliwice
On 5 June 2019, Piast Gliwice confirmed that they had signed Milewski on a 2-year contract.

References

External links
Sebastian Milewski at 90minut.pl

1998 births
People from Mława
Living people
Polish footballers
Association football midfielders
Poland youth international footballers
Poland under-21 international footballers
Ekstraklasa players
I liga players
II liga players
Legionovia Legionowo players
Zagłębie Sosnowiec players
Piast Gliwice players
Arka Gdynia players